Veera Kivirinta (born 6 April 1995) is a Finnish swimmer. She competed in the women's 50 metre breaststroke event at the 2017 World Aquatics Championships.

References

External links
 

1995 births
Living people
Place of birth missing (living people)
Finnish female breaststroke swimmers